Conella is a genus of sea snails, marine gastropod mollusks in the family Columbellidae, the dove snails.

Species
Species within the genus Conella include:

 Conella ovulata (Lamarck, 1822)
 Conella ovuloides (C. B. Adams, 1850)

References

External links
 de Maintenon M. J. (2005). "Phylogenetic relationships of the tropical American columbellid taxa Conella, Eurypyrene, and Parametaria (Gastropoda: Neogastropoda)". Journal of Paleontology 79(3): 497-508. .

Columbellidae